Morales is a Spanish surname. Notable people with the surname include:
 Alfredo Morales (born 1990), American footballer
 Alvaro Morales (disambiguation), several people
 Amado Morales (born 1947), Puerto Rican javelin thrower
 Bartolomé Morales (1737–?), Spanish officer and Florida colonial official
 Campo Elías Delgado Morales (1934–1986), Colombian spree killer
 Carlos Adrián Morales, Mexican football (soccer) player
 Carlos Luis Morales, Ecuadorian football (soccer) goalkeeper
 Carlos Morales Santos, Paraguayan football (soccer) player
 Carlos Morales Troncoso (1940-2014), Dominican politician, former foreign minister
 Carlos Morales (American soccer) (born 1982), Puerto Rican football (soccer) player
 Christina Morales, American politician
 Cristina Morales (born 1993), Spanish kickboxer
 Cristóbal de Morales (c. 1500 – 1553), Spanish composer
 Dan Morales (born 1956), American politician from Texas
 Daniel Morales (footballer) (born 1975), Brazilian footballer
 Daniel Morales (swimmer) (born 1977), Spanish former swimmer
 David Morales (musician) (born 1961), New York-based American DJ and music producer
 David Sánchez Morales (1925–1978), American CIA operative
 Dianne Morales (born 1967), American non-profit executive and political candidate
 Eduardo Morales Miranda, Chilean physician and founder of Universidad Austral de Chile
 Enrique Martín Morales, known as Ricky Martin, Grammy Award winning Puerto Rican pop singer
 Erik Morales (born 1976), Mexican professional boxer
 Esai Morales (born 1962), Puerto Rican actor
 Evo Morales (born 1959), President of Bolivia
 Fernando Morales (volleyball) (born 1982), Puerto Rican volleyball player
 Florencio Morales Ramos (1915–1989), Puerto Rican singer, trovador and composer
 Francisco Morales (disambiguation), several people
 Franco Morales (born 1992), Chilean basketball player
 Frank Morales (born 1949), New York City-based American priest and journalist
 Franklin Morales (born 1986), Venezuelan baseball player
 Franklin E. Morales (1884–1962), American diplomat
 Guillem Morales (born 1973), Spanish filmmaker
 Jacobo Morales (born 1934), Puerto Rican actor
 Javier Morales (born 1980), Argentine football (soccer) player
Jimmy Morales, President of Guatemala
 Juan Bautista Morales (c. 1597–1664), Spanish Dominican missionary
 José Morales (designated hitter) (born 1944), American baseball player
 José Luis Morales (born 1973), Spanish football player
 José Luis Morales (born 1987), Spanish football player
 Kendrys Morales (born 1983), Cuban baseball player
 Leonardo Morales (Scouting), Costa Rican scout leader
 Luis Morales (athlete) (born 1964), Puerto Rican track and field sprinter
 Manolo Rivera Morales (1934–1996), Puerto Rican sportscaster
 Manuel Morales (basketball) (born 1987), Peruvian basketball player
 Marco Morales (American football), American football player
 Mario Morales (born 1960), Puerto Rican basketball player
 Mark Morales (aka Prince Markie Dee) (1968–2021), American dance music producer
 Memo Morales (1937–2017), Venezuelan singer
 Natalie Morales (actress), American actress
 Natalie Morales (journalist), American journalist for NBC
 Pablo Morales (born 1962) American Olympic swimmer, Gold and Silver medalist
 Pablo Morales Pérez (1905–1969), Venezuelan baseball executive and promoter
 Pedro Morales (1942–2019), Puerto Rican professional wrestler
 Pedro Morales Flores (born 1985), Chilean football player
 Rags Morales, American comic book artist
 Ramón Morales (born 1975), Mexican professional footballer
 Dr. Ramón Villeda Morales (1908–1971), President of Honduras
 Rebecca Jo Morales (born 1962), American artist
 Ricardo Arjona Morales, Guatemalan song writer, music producer, poet, singer 
 Ricardo Morales (born 1972), American musician
 Rodolfo Morales (1925–2001), Mexican artist
 Sylvestro "Pedro" Morales (18??–1???), Mexican bandit
 Vina Morales (born 1975), Filipino singer and actor
 Virgilio Morales Díaz, Cuban Boy Scout leader

de Morales
 Cristóbal de Morales (c. 1500 – 1553), Spanish composer
 Luis de Morales (c. 1510 – 1586), Spanish painter

y Morales
 Gerardo Machado y Morales (1871–1939), Cuban politician

Fictional characters
 Morales, in the television series The Walking Dead
 Jim Moralés, in Code Lyoko (voiced by David Gasman)
 Enrique Morales, in the HBO series Oz
 Lt. Morales, the combat medic, a playable character in the video game Heroes of the Storm
 Ramón Morales, in the 2019 film Scary Stories to Tell in the Dark
 Miles Morales, Spider-Man in the Ultimate Comics: Spider-Man comic book series
 Diana Morales, character in the musical A Chorus Line

Spanish-language surnames